Amitabha Monastery is a Himalayan Buddhist monastery in Nepal.

Overview
The Amitabha Monastery sits on the top of Druk Amitabha mountain overlooking Kathmandu Valley. It is a center for spiritual practice and for humanitarian causes  It has a hall that seats up to 2,000 people, a library, administration office for the Drukpa Lineage, a nunnery, residences for 300 nuns, and a medical clinic. It is a refuge for animals saved from butchering and has vegetable gardens to provide food for the center. The hiking trail here are as attractive as the monastery and the surrounding scenarios.

References 

Buddhist temples in Nepal
Drukpa Kagyu monasteries and temples
Religious buildings and structures in Kathmandu
Tourist attractions in Kathmandu